Darius James Pearce (born 23 February 1972) is a Jersey businessman and former politician who was imprisoned for money laundering.

Early life and education 
Pearce was born in the City of London. He was educated at De La Salle College, Jersey. In 1997 he graduated from the University of Plymouth, where he read politics and criminal justice. In 2000 he qualified as an accountant and was appointed directorships in companies in Jersey involved in online marketing, fulfillment and accountancy. On 1 March 2009 he purchased his family's jewellery business outright.

Political life
Darius Pearce first became politically active in November 2005 and has acted generally in opposition to the government of Jersey. As a leading member of the Centre Party (Jersey), he stood for Deputy in St Helier 3 & 4 districts, polling 459 votes (6.9%). Subsequently, he was one of the founding members of Progress Jersey, a charity and pressure group whose aims include to encourage electoral turnout and voter knowledge - a group he served as treasurer, until his resignation in May 2007. He was editor of Parish Matters, a quarterly newsletter produced by Progress Jersey for residents of the Parish of St Helier.

Elected to the municipality of the Parish of St Helier in December 2005, he served as a Roads Inspector for the Roads Committee and member of the Constable's Accounts Committee. He was active in age of consent debates on sexual offences, and the effects of their interpretations in local law, European law and international law.

Political activity
Pearce has opposed a number of government propositions.

He has made submissions to various Scrutiny Panels. This includes a submission regarding Jersey's tax changes, in 2005 he noted that the EU would oppose the tax changes that the Jersey government subsequently introduced. In 2009 the EU duly noted their objection to the revised tax codes adopted by Jersey. He also presented the idea of a Business Premises Tax, which was adapted into the "Blampied proposal".

As a founder member, he has worked for Progress Jersey on a number of key issues including submissions made and accepted regarding the introduction of Abuse of Trust legislation, the review of changes to Jersey Taxation, Social Housing, Civil Partnerships, Legitimacy Laws and Overseas Aid.

Abuse of trust
He was responsible for the withdrawal of the initial proposition to lower the age of homosexual consent, this was later passed once the Abuse of Trust provisions were added to the amendment.

No disorderly conduct offence
In 2007, he was involved with the successful campaign against the proposed Crime (Disorderly Conduct and Harassment) law, which was withdrawn amidst fears that it extended police powers too far.

Reform of Jersey legitimacy laws
Pearce made a submission to Jersey Scrutiny on behalf of Progress Jersey highlighting the inconsistency of the Legitimacy (Jersey) Law 1973, as amended with the position of Jersey as a signatory to the European Convention of Human Rights.

The proposition was accepted by scrutiny in June 2006 and the matter referred to the Legislation Committee. In January 2007, following the introduction of the Human Rights (Jersey) Law 2000 a case was brought before the Royal Court by a local lawyer who claimed that her illegitimate child was being discriminated against as he could not take the name of his father and that the fatherhood was not allowed to be recorded.

In June 2007 as part of her announcement to step down from office, the Home Affairs Minister Wendy Kinnard indicated that it was her intention to bring a change to the Legitimacy Law.

In January 2008 the States of Jersey voted to introduce DNA tests where paternity of a child was contested, and Kinnard publicly stated that she supported the introduction of the right of unmarried parents to name their child after the father.

He is also a member of the UK Conservative Party and has expressed a desire to foment stronger links with the United Kingdom Conservative Party. A spokesman for the UK Conservative Party stated that Mr. Pearce, whilst not yet an official representative of the Conservative Party, had approached the party expressing an interest in re-establishing the Channel Islands branch of Conservatives Abroad and that he had been invited to talks in London.

Press resistance to party politics
In July 2007, immediately following the announcement that the Jersey Conservative Party would be established in opposition to the incumbent government, the Jersey Evening Post reported that he made an accusation that photos picturing Senator Frank Walker with Gordon Brown and Ian Paisley were faked to insert Senator Walker in a letter to Gordon Brown. However, Progress Jersey reports described the photo as simply suspicious, they further indicated that no letter had been sent.

Pearce subsequently apologised, explaining that it was a private joke which had been blown out of proportion by the Jersey Evening Post but expressed concerns with regard to a bias in the paper in favour of former managing director and then Chief Minister Frank Walker based on e-mail correspondence with the Chief Minister and the editor of the JEP, Chris Bright.

Party name on ballot paper
Following the Jersey Evening Post coverage of the idea of the Jersey Conservative Party, Pearce submitted a complaint to the Press Complaints Commission citing eighteen significant inaccuracies or misleading statements. The matter was resolved through mediation following the expansion of the debate on the importance of political parties in the revised Jersey constitution and an assurance from the JEP's editor of fair treatment in future.

The matter added to the pressure that eventually led to the introduction of party names on Jersey ballot papers.

Criminal charges

In November 2007, he appeared in the Magistrates Court on charges of assault against his, then, wife. He was instructed to not make contact with her.

On 17 December 2020, Pearce was found guilty of using his Central Market jewellery business to launder money from a foiled plot to smuggle almost £1 million-worth of drugs into Jersey. Seven other people were previously jailed for a combined total of 74 years for their role in the conspiracy. In April 2021 Pearce made an application for trial by combat as part of his appeal in addition to applying for the  against his property to be amended. On 1 May 2021 the court quashed his complaint describing it as "scurrilous" and rejected his application for bail. Pearce was ultimately given a 7 and a half years prison sentence in July 2021.

References

External links
12 Parishes of Jersey Website
Progress Jersey Homepage 
Stay away from wife, would-be Constable told

1972 births
Living people
Municipality members of Jersey
People educated at De La Salle College, Jersey
Jersey Roman Catholics
People from Saint Helier
Alumni of the University of Plymouth
Centre Party (Jersey) politicians
Jersey criminals
English money launderers